Reeve Burgess was a bus body manufacturer based in Pilsley, North East Derbyshire in the United Kingdom. It was a subsidiary of Plaxton from 1980 until its closure in 1991.

History 
The original company known as Harry Reeve was founded in Bridge Street, Pilsley, Derbyshire in 1888, initially carrying out work as the local wheelwright and blacksmith. Harry Reeve progressed to building a wide variety of horse-drawn vehicles, including pony traps for milk delivery vehicles, and horse-drawn ambulances for local collieries.

After World War I, the founder was joined by his son John (Jack) Reeve who was involved in the business for over 50 years. In 1925 after the death of his father, the company was formed into a limited company partnership with George Kenning of Clay Cross and became Reeve and Kenning Ltd.

A wide variety of vehicles were then produced including brewery trucks, and the first buses and coaches.

The factory produced the complete vehicle, from the design department to the machine shop, where the timber was cut, the blacksmiths shop where the ironwork was shaped, the panel shop for panel beating, the body shop for the actual building of the vehicle and the paint and signwriting shops for the completion of the vehicle. It was a major employer for the area, offering apprenticeships for all these trades.

In 1958 the company became Reeve (Coachbuilders) Limited after the Kenning family interest was bought by the Reeve family, thereby reverting to the original founding company.  The managing director was Jack Reeve, who by this time had been joined by his son Harry Reeve.

During the 1960s and early 1970s, a number of developments took place, in particular the manufacture of demountable box van bodies, and Robinsons of Chesterfield was the first operator to place a large order for this particular type of product.  Derbyshire County Council's first mobile library fleet was also produced during the mid 1960s.

Following the sale of the company in 1974 to T.H. Burgess Holdings of Worcester, the name was changed to Reeve Burgess Ltd. A rationalisation of the company's products took place and a far greater degree of specialisation was introduced.

In 1976 the first venture was made into the small coach market with the introduction of the REEBUR 17 based mainly on the Bedford CF chassis and later on the Ford Transit chassis, and the company had considerable success with this vehicle during the next few years. Around 1979 the company started to convert Mercedes vans into luxury mini-coaches.

In 1980 the company became part of the Plaxtons Group p.l.c., the leading United Kingdom producers of large luxury coaches based in Scarborough.

Following the deregulation of local bus services in 1984, the National Bus Company purchased large numbers of mini buses, and additional premises were acquired in Stonebroom Derbyshire, at this point the number of people employed was in the region of 260. A new paint shop was also needed in order to meet production requirements, and this was expanded again in 1986 in order that the company could carry out the maximum amount of painting on its own premises, and over 600 vehicle were built and sold.

Vehicle range 
REEBUR 17s were built on Bedford CF and Ford Transit chassis. Mercedes 207 and 307 vans were converted into 12 seater mini coaches. Mercedes 508 and 608 vans were converted into 19, 21 and 25 seater mini coaches. A few Iveco Dailys and VW LT vans were also converted into mini-coaches. 

The highly successful Beaver range of minibuses was developed during the 1980s, with hundreds produced seating from 21 to 33 passengers on three different chassis, Mercedes 609/709, Dodge 50 and the Iveco Daily.

The Riviera was the largest coach produced by Reeve Burgess with over 50 being built on MAN VW 8.136 chassis in the mid 1980s. Although it started life called the RB26 with only 26 seats, it quickly gained an extra two seats and then another four bringing the seating capacity up to 32 at which point it gained a redesigned front end and was renamed the Riviera. Four 35 seat Rivieras were built on shortened wheelbase Leyland Tiger chassis for Tayside Public Transport, Dundee, and one Riviera was built on the unusual rear-engined Quest 80 chassis for Telford Development Corporation where Quest 80 were based.

Towards the final years Reeve Burgess developed an aluminium framed bus that went on to be built by Plaxtons as the Pointer on Dennis Dart chassis.

Reeve Burgess started building Fibreglass bodied ambulances following the Plaxtons takeover and closure of Hanlon ambulance in Ireland, opening a further factory in Tibshelf, Derbyshire with a small group of ex-Hanlon employees relocating from Ireland.

Factory Closure
Despite a healthy order book and good range of vehicles the factory was closed in 1991 with loss of all jobs, all orders and manufacturing were moved to the Plaxtons' Scarborough site who was struggling with a downturn in the large coach industry. Harry Reeve great-grandson of the original founder remained at the company after the 1980 Plaxtons takeover as Sales Director until its closure.

Reeve Burgess bodied some Leyland chassis including the Cub, Swift and four rare short wheelbase Tigers, but is probably best known for the Pointer body on Dennis Dart chassis, and the Beaver minibus on (usually) Mercedes-Benz chassis. Both of these were badged as Reeve Burgess products until their demise, whereafter they were badged as Plaxton products. This process resulted in some Dennis Dart/Plaxton Pointers receiving both Plaxton and Reeve Burgess body numbers, in a similar manner to some Northern Counties vehicles.

References

Defunct bus manufacturers of the United Kingdom
Companies based in Derbyshire